A Ṣa‘īdī (Coptic: ⲣⲉⲙⲣⲏⲥ Remris) is a person from Upper Egypt (Coptic: ⲙⲁⲣⲏⲥ Maris).

Etymology 
The word literally means "from Ṣa‘īd" (i.e. Upper Egypt), and can also refer to a form of music originating there, or to the dialect spoken by Sa‘idis. The Arabic word Ṣa‘īd, as a geographical term, means "highland, upland, plateau". The suffix "-i" denotes the adjective.

Upper Egypt)".

Stereotypes and jokes 
Ṣa‘īdis and their dialect are the subject of numerous Egyptian stereotypes and ethnic jokes, mainly from the upper-class Egyptians who own businesses in Egypt's major cities and used to hire Upper Egyptian workers in construction fields. They are popularly assumed to be rural simpletons by other Egyptians. An example of such stereotyping is the popular 1998 film Ṣa‘īdi fil-Gama‘a al-Amrikiya ("A Ṣa‘īdi in the American University") starring Mohamed Henedi, whose main character is portrayed as less fashionable than the other Egyptian students of the American University in Cairo.

Socioeconomic status 

Approximately 40% of Egyptians live in Upper Egypt, and 80% of Egypt's severe poverty is concentrated in Upper Egypt. The settling of family disputes and blood feuds by firearms (often antiquated, such as Mauser rifle) since at least the 1940s is a long cultural trend in the community, especially in the Hamradoum and Nag Hammadi areas. Weapons smuggling from Libya and Sudan is also notable in the area.

Religion in Upper Egypt 
The Upper Egyptians follow Islam and Christianity as Upper Egypt has a significant Christian population and a rich Coptic Christian history. For instance, Sahidic was the leading Coptic dialect in the pre-Islamic period. In the last few decades the high proportion of Coptic Christians in Upper Egypt has enabled some Christians to hold prominent political posts there. For instance, Qena Governorate had a Coptic Christian governor in 2011. Sahidic dialect of Coptic is used as a Liturgical language by the clergy and among Sa'idi Copts.

See also
 Fellah
 Nubian people
 Beja people
Upper Egypt
Sa'idi Arabic (the dialect spoken by Sa'idis)
Sahidic Coptic
Tahtib

References

Ancient peoples
Ethnic groups in Egypt
Upper Egypt